Cisse Cameron (born January 5, 1954) is an American television and film actress.

Cameron made her film debut in Billy Jack (1971), and her career culminated with the lead role of Dr. Lea Jansen in the 1988 science fiction film Space Mutiny. In 1974 she played the title role in a summer stock tour of Sugar, starring Alan Sues. She has also appeared in guest roles on television shows such as The Love Boat, Alice, Too Close for Comfort, and Three's Company.

Cameron played Sally Hooper in BOOM BOOM ROOM at Lincoln Center's Vivian Beaumont Theater for the New York Shakespeare Festival in 1973.  She was credited as Cissy Colpitts.She appeared on The Merv Griffin Show as herself with husband Reb Brown in 1980. She appeared on The Phil Donahue Show in 1978 as herself promoting The Ted Knight Show series where she played Graziella Pomerantz.

Filmography

References

External links

American film actresses
American television actresses
Living people
1954 births
21st-century American women